Jämshögs IF is a Swedish football club located in Jämshög.

Background
Jämshögs IF currently plays in Division 4 Blekinge, which is the sixth tier of Swedish football. They play their home matches at the Motorpavallen in Jämshög, and the club is affiliated with Blekinge Fotbollförbund. Jämshögs IF have competed in the Svenska Cupen on 16 occasions and have completed a total of 34 matches.

Season to season

References

External links
 Jämshögs IF – Official website
 Jämshögs IF on Facebook

Football clubs in Blekinge County
Association football clubs established in 1931
1931 establishments in Sweden